Saint Margaret Shrine is a Roman Catholic shrine and church in Bridgeport, Connecticut, part of the Diocese of Bridgeport. The Shrine has a Veterans memorial in addition to catholic art.

History 
Saint Margaret Shrine was built by Rev. Emilio Lasiello in response to the 1941 Attack on Pearl Harbor. The Shrine also features a Padre Pio Chapel.

References 

Roman Catholic Diocese of Bridgeport
Roman Catholic shrines in the United States
Catholic Church in Connecticut
World War II memorials
Tourist attractions in Bridgeport, Connecticut